The island castle, or insular castle, is a variation of the water castle. It is distinguished by its location on an artificial or natural island. It is a typical lowland castle.

Because the island on which the castle was erected is separated from the shore by at least two bodies of water, artificial defences such as moats or shield walls were usually unnecessary if the castle was surrounded by flowing water. Such castles could therefore be very easily and cheaply built. Many island castles in lakes were, however, relatively easily captured in winter if there was an ice sheet thick enough to support attacking troops, because they were often rather poorly fortified.

European island castles

 The best-known island castle in Germany is Pfalzgrafenstein Castle near Kaub, Rhineland-Palatinate
 The Chateau d'If is situated on the southern coast of France
 Mont-Saint Michel in Normandy, France becomes an island castle during high tide
 The English counterpart to Mont-Saint-Michel is St Michael's Mount in Cornwall
 Switzerland's iconic Chillon Castle sits on a small island on the eastern end of Lake Geneva
 The Aragonese Castle is situated in the Gulf of Naples
 The only water castle in Europe that utilizes Gothic architecture is Trakai Castle in Lithuania

Island castles in South Asia 
Though not entirely a castle, really consisting of a fort surrounding a palace, Murud-Janjira is a famous island fortress off the Indian coast in the Arabian Sea. The fortress is relatively unique in that the outermost defensive walls of the compound entirely encompass the island's natural land, thwarting any attacks using traditional amphibious landings.

See also

 Castle

References

Sources 
 
 

Castles by type